Ünal Tosun (born 5 October 1992) is a professional footballer who plays as an attacking midfielder for Türkgücü München. Tosun was born in Munich and is of Turkish descent.

References

External links
 

Living people
1992 births
German footballers
German people of Turkish descent
Footballers from Munich
Association football midfielders
SpVgg Unterhaching II players
FC Unterföhring players
SSV Jahn Regensburg II players
FC Pipinsried players
Türkgücü München players
3. Liga players
Regionalliga players
Bayernliga players